This is a list of star-forming regions located in the Milky Way Galaxy and in the Local Group. Star formation occurs in molecular clouds which become unstable to gravitational collapse, and these complexes may contain clusters of young stars and regions of ionized gas called H II regions. Stars typically form in groups of many stars, rather than in isolation.

Galactic Star-Forming Regions

Extragalactic Star-Forming Regions

See also 

List of nearest stars and brown dwarfs

References

External links 
 Simbad

Astronomy-related lists
H II regions
Local Group
Open clusters